Methyldioxirane is an organic chemical consisting of a methyl group as substituent on a dioxirane ring. It is a highly unstable structure that has been proposed as part of a decomposition reaction of acetaldehyde oxide, the Criegee intermediate during some ozonolysis reactions. The methyl group helps reduce the rate of ring-opening of the dioxirane, but it does not become usefully stable until a second substient is present as in the structure of dimethyldioxirane.

References 

Dioxiranes